The Illinois–Missouri football rivalry, also known as the Arch Rivalry, is an American college football rivalry between the Illinois Fighting Illini football team of the University of Illinois and Missouri Tigers football team of the University of Missouri. Both schools consider it a friendlier, secondary rivalry compared to their other rivalries like the Border War and Northwestern, but it still generates interest from students and alumni, especially those in and around Greater St. Louis. Both schools have considerable alumni from the area.

Although match-ups generally have not taken place annually, in recent years, the series has been played more frequently. It was the opening game of the season for both teams, for the 2007 through 2010 seasons. After the 2010 season, the series has ceased through 2026, when the two schools will renew the game. On November 6, 2011, Missouri accepted an invitation to join the SEC in 2012. As a result, any future meetings between the two schools will be labeled as a Big Ten vs. SEC matchup.

The schools first met in 1896, and played sporadically until 1966. They played six straight seasons from 1975–80, helping to start a series in men's basketball. That series has been played in all but one year since 1980, and is known as Braggin' Rights. Unlike the Arch Rivalry, the annual Braggin' Rights game is still an active tradition.

On November 20, 2017, both schools announced a renewing of the series to start in 2026. The series will be played on the campuses of the two schools.

Venue
The series started in St. Louis, Missouri, in 1896. For the majority of the history of the series, it had traded off between Memorial Stadium in Champaign, Illinois, and Faurot Field in Columbia, Missouri. In 2002, the games returned to St. Louis where they played at The Dome at America's Center. Missouri has claimed victory at every game since the series returned to St. Louis. Missouri leads 5–1 when played in Columbia. The series is tied 5–5 for games played in Champaign.

Game results

See also  
 List of NCAA college football rivalry games
 Braggin' Rights - the basketball equivalent

References

College football rivalries in the United States
Illinois Fighting Illini football
Missouri Tigers football